Resureksyon is a 2015 Filipino horror drama film directed by Alfonso Torre III and starring Paulo Avelino, Jasmine Curtis-Smith and Isabelle Daza. It was released on September 23, 2015, and produced by Regal Entertainment and Reality Entertainment.

Plot
Ailah is a young woman who's left to fend for herself and her nephew after being orphaned at a young age; Mara is Ailah's older sister who's arrived home from working abroad inside a coffin only to be resurrected as a vicious vampire.

Cast 
 Paulo Avelino as Javier del Ocampo
 Jasmine Curtis-Smith as Ailah Libangan
 Isabelle Daza as Mara Alvarado
 John Lapus as Tito Baby
 Raikko Mateo as Miguel dela Peña
 Niño Muhlach as Mayor Diamante
 Alex Castro as Ramil
 Gee Canlas as Rita
 Franco Lagusad as Daryl Mendoza
 Juancho Trivino as Ethan Ocampo
 Prince Villanueva as Jared Alvarado

See also 
 List of Filipino films in 2015

References

External links 
 

2015 films
Philippine horror films
2015 horror films
2010s Tagalog-language films
Regal Entertainment films
2010s horror drama films
2015 drama films
2010s English-language films